Motipur is a village development committee in Morang District in the Kosi Zone of south-eastern Nepal. According to the 1991 Nepal census, it had a population of 4611 people living in 861 individual households.

References

Village development committees in Morang District
Gramthan Rural Municipality